The 1987 Arizona State Sun Devils baseball team represented Arizona State University in the 1987 NCAA Division I baseball season. The Sun Devils played their home games at Packard Stadium, and played as part of the Pacific-10 Conference. The team was coached by Jim Brock in his sixteenth season as head coach at Arizona State.

The Sun Devils reached the College World Series, their fourteenth appearance in Omaha, where they finished tied for seventh place after losing to eventual runner-up Oklahoma State and fifth place Florida State.

Personnel

Roster

Coaches

Schedule and results

References

Arizona State Sun Devils baseball seasons
Arizona State Sun Devils
College World Series seasons
Arizona State Sun Devils baseball